Cyberpirates! is a 1997 role-playing game supplement for Shadowrun published by FASA.

Contents
Cyberpirates! is a supplement in which pirates have access to cyberware and magic.

Reception
Cyberpirates! was reviewed in the online second version of Pyramid which said "As with the Underworld Sourcebook, this excellent title gives a whole new direction for Shadowrun campaigns."

Reviews
Backstab #7
Envoyer (German) (Issue 16 - Feb 1998)
Envoyer (German) (Issue 23 - Sep 1998)

References

Role-playing game supplements introduced in 1997
Shadowrun supplements